"Got No Reason Now for Goin' Home" is a song written by Johnny Russell, and recorded by American country music artist Gene Watson.  It was released in October 1984 as the first single from the album Heartaches and Love and Stuff.  The song reached #7 on the Billboard Hot Country Singles & Tracks chart.

Chart performance

References

1985 singles
1984 songs
Gene Watson songs
Songs written by Johnny Russell (singer)
MCA Records singles